Racovițeni is a commune in Buzău County, Muntenia, Romania. It is composed of three villages: Budrea, Petrișoru and Racovițeni.

Notes

Communes in Buzău County
Localities in Muntenia